The 1997 edition of the Campeonato Carioca kicked off on January 12, 1997 and ended on July 8, 1997. It is the official tournament organized by FFERJ (Federação de Futebol do Estado do Rio de Janeiro, or Rio de Janeiro State Football Federation. Only clubs based in the Rio de Janeiro State are allowed to play. Twelve teams contested this edition. Botafogo won the title for the 17th time. Barreira was relegated.

System
The tournament was divided in three stages:
 Taça Guanabara: The twelve teams all played in single round-robin format against each other. The eight best teams qualified to the Taça Rio, the best two among them playing a final match against each other to define the champions. The bottom team was relegated.
 Taça Rio: The 8 remaining clubs all played in single round-robin format against each other. The six best teams qualified to the Third phase.
 Third phase: The six remaining clubs all played in single round-robin format against each other.
 Finals: Their format would depend on the quantity of teams that won the previous stages. In case that one team won two and other one, which was the case that wound up happening, the winner of the most phases would gain four bonus points, and the Finals would be disputed in a best-of-six points series.

Championship

Taça Guanabara

Finals

Taça Rio

Third phase

Finals

References

Campeonato Carioca seasons
Carioca